Una Noche con Rubén Blades (A Night with Rubén Blades) is the first live jazz album between Jazz at Lincoln Center Orchestra with Wynton Marsalis and Rubén Blades. The album received a Grammy Award nomination for Best Latin Jazz Album. It peaked at #39 on the Billboard Top Latin Albums chart.

Track list

References

2018 live albums
Live Latin jazz albums
Rubén Blades live albums
Wynton Marsalis live albums